Charles David Jones Bryant (11 May 1883 – 22 January 1937), known as Charles Bryant, was an Australian marine artist.

Life and career

Early life
Bryant was born at Enmore, Sydney, the fifth son of John Ambrose Bryant, storekeeper, and his wife Caroline, née Leedon. He was educated at Sydney Grammar School and studied the cello. He then obtained a position in the Bank of New South Wales.

Career
Bryant studied painting at Sydney under W. Lister Lister, and was an exhibitor at the Royal Art Society of New South Wales for some years. He went to London in 1908 and studied with John Hassall at London and Julius Olsson, A.R.A., at St Ives, Cornwall. He exhibited at the Royal Academy and the Paris Salon, where he received an honourable mention for "Morning Mists" in 1913, and with many well-known societies. He was appointed an official war artist on the Western Front in 1917 and did many paintings for the Australian government. Sixty-nine of his paintings are in the Australian War Memorial, Canberra.

In 1922, he returned to Australia, and in 1923 was sent to the mandated territories in New Guinea to paint scenes of the occupation by the Australians. In 1925, he painted a picture of the American fleet which was presented by Sydney citizens to the United States government. This picture is now at the Capitol, Washington. Returning to England, some 10 years passed before Bryant was in Australia again. He had a very successful one man show at Sydney towards the end of 1936, which was followed by another at Melbourne.

Bryant was an able oil painter mostly of marine subjects. He held various official positions with art societies, having been a member of the council of the Royal Institute of Oil Painters, a vice-president of the Royal Art Society, Sydney, and president of the London Sketch Club. He is represented in the Sydney, Melbourne, Adelaide, Castlemaine and Manly galleries, the Australian War Memorial, and the Imperial War Museum, London.

Death
He was unmarried. He died at Manly, Sydney on 22 January 1937 and he was buried in the Church of England cemetery.

Selected paintings

References
Joanna Mendelssohn, 'Bryant, Charles David Jones (1883–1937)', Australian Dictionary of Biography, Volume 7, MUP, 1979, pp 469–470.

External links

More works by Bryant @ ArtNet

1883 births
1937 deaths
People educated at Sydney Grammar School
20th-century Australian painters
20th-century Australian male artists
Australian male painters